La puerta de no retorno  is a 2010 film.

Synopsis 
Santiago A. Zannou accompanies his father, Alphonse, to his homeland, Benin, 40 years after he left it, to face his fears and his lies. On this journey of redemption, Alphonse will not just seek reconciliation with his only living sister, but also forgiveness from his ancestors, in the hopes of finally laying the hurt of the past to rest.

References

External links 

 

2010 films
Spanish documentary films
2010s Spanish films